The 2018–19 Fox Cricket National Premier Twenty20 Championships is an Australian Twenty20 cricket competition. This was the inaugural addition of the competition. It featured ten teams from the Premier Cricket Twenty20 competitions around Australia. It took place over two days on 5 and 6 March 2019. All matches took place in the Karen Rolton Oval precinct in Adelaide, South Australia. Carlton Cricket Club won the Championships.

Teams

Qualification 
The winners from the Australian Capital Territory, Northern Territory, Queensland, South Australian, Tasmanian and Western Australian Premier Cricket Twenty20 competitions qualified for this tournament. The finalists from the New South Wales and Victorian Premier Twenty20 competitions also qualified.

Teams

Ladder

Fixtures

Round 1

Round 2

Finals

Bracket

Semi-finals

Final

References

External links
 Cricket Australia official website
 Official CA Facebook page

Australia